Jokerman may refer to:
Jokerman (song), a song by Bob Dylan
Jokerman (typeface), a typeface created in 1995